Cortinarius violaceorubens is a basidiomycete fungus of the genus Cortinarius native Finland and Sweden in Scandinavia, south to France and Germany. It is associated with spruce (Picea). Genetically it is closely related to C. cyanites and C. boreicyanites.

References

External links

violaceorubens
Fungi of Europe
Fungi described in 1990